Ioannis Thymaras (born 1934) is a Greek water polo player. He competed in the men's tournament at the 1968 Summer Olympics. He was part of the legendary Ethnikos Piraeus team that won 18 consecutive championships (1953–1970) and stayed unbeaten for 13 years during the 50s and 60s.

See also
 Greece men's Olympic water polo team records and statistics
 List of men's Olympic water polo tournament goalkeepers

References

External links
 

1934 births
Living people
Water polo goalkeepers
Greek male water polo players
Olympic water polo players of Greece
Water polo players at the 1968 Summer Olympics
People from Spetses
Sportspeople from Attica

Ethnikos Piraeus Water Polo Club players